is a Japanese figure skating coach. Her current and former students include Midori Ito, Mao Asada, Yoshie Onda, Yukari Nakano, Mai Asada, Kumiko Koiwai, Kanako Murakami, Mako Yamashita, and Rino Matsuike.

References

Japanese figure skating coaches
Living people
Figure skaters from Nagoya
Female sports coaches
Year of birth missing (living people)